Pauline Johnson Collegiate & Vocational School in Brantford, Ontario, Canada is a composite high school with collegiate and vocational departments.  It was named in honour of the Canadian First Nations poet E. Pauline Johnson, who was born nearby.

The school was officially opened on October 18, 1955. In 1960, the fine new vocational wing was opened for use by the Technical and Commercial Departments making possible a full composite school. A second addition was completed in 1963. In 1971, a new addition provided more facilities.

See also
List of high schools in Ontario

References

External links
 Pauline Johnson Collegiate & Vocational School

High schools in Brantford
1955 establishments in Ontario
Educational institutions established in 1955